Yanoshi is a village in Zakarpattia Oblast (province) of western Ukraine.

Geography
The village is located around 6 km east of Berehove. Administratively, the village belongs to the Berehove Raion, Zakarpattia Oblast.

History
It was first mentioned as  Ivanosi in 1321.

Population
In 1910, it had a population of 1118, mostly Hungarians.
According to the official census of 2001, the population included 2030 inhabitants.

Villages in Berehove Raion